Lyndon is a city in, and the county seat of Osage County, Kansas, United States.  As of the 2020 census, the population of the city was 1,037.

History

Lyndon was founded in 1869 after the land in the area was taken from the Sac and Fox Nation by the government for homesteading. It was named after Lyndon, Vermont.

Geography
Lyndon is located at  (38.610233, -95.685352).

Climate
The climate in this area is characterized by hot, humid summers and generally mild to cool winters.  According to the Köppen Climate Classification system, Lyndon has a humid subtropical climate, abbreviated "Cfa" on climate maps.

Demographics

Lyndon is part of the Topeka metropolitan area.

2010 census
As of the census of 2010, there were 1,052 people, 422 households, and 285 families living in the city. The racial makeup of the city was 97.5% White, 0.4% African American, 0.7% Native American, 0.1% Asian, and 1.3% from two or more races. Hispanic or Latino of any race were 1.0% of the population.

There were 422 households, of which 37.0% had children under the age of 18 living with them, 53.8% were married couples living together, 10.9% had a female householder with no husband present, 2.8% had a male householder with no wife present, and 32.5% were non-families. 29.1% of all households were made up of individuals, and 13.8% had someone living alone who was 65 years of age or older. The average household size was 2.45 and the average family size was 3.02.

The median age in the city was 36.8 years. 28% of residents were under the age of 18; 6.1% were between the ages of 18 and 24; 26.2% were from 25 to 44; 25.7% were from 45 to 64; and 13.9% were 65 years of age or older. The gender makeup of the city was 50.9% male and 49.1% female.

2000 census
As of the census of 2000, there were 1,038 people, 419 households, and 297 families living in the city. The racial makeup of the city was 97.98% White, 0.48% Native American, 0.19% Asian, 0.10% Pacific Islander, 0.77% from other races, and 0.48% from two or more races. Hispanic or Latino of any race were 0.77% of the population.

There were 419 households, out of which 32.9% had children under the age of 18 living with them, 58.5% were married couples living together, 8.4% had a female householder with no husband present, and 28.9% were non-families. 24.8% of all households were made up of individuals, and 15.5% had someone living alone who was 65 years of age or older. The average household size was 2.46 and the average family size was 2.91.

In the city, the population was spread out, with 26.0% under the age of 18, 7.0% from 18 to 24, 26.3% from 25 to 44, 22.4% from 45 to 64, and 18.2% who were 65 years of age or older. The median age was 39 years. For every 100 females, there were 101.6 males. For every 100 females age 18 and over, there were 91.0 males.

The median income for a household in the city was $36,250, and the median income for a family was $44,231. Males had a median income of $33,750 versus $19,671 for females. The per capita income for the city was $16,968. About 7.8% of families and 10.9% of the population were below the poverty line, including 12.4% of those under age 18 and 14.7% of those age 65 or over.

Gallery

See also
 National Register of Historic Places listings in Osage County, Kansas
 Melvern Lake
 Pomona State Park

References

Further reading

External links

 City of Lyndon 
 Lyndon - Directory of Public Officials
 USD 421, local school district
 Lyndon city map, KDOT

Cities in Kansas
County seats in Kansas
Cities in Osage County, Kansas
Topeka metropolitan area, Kansas
1869 establishments in Kansas
Populated places established in 1869